The Tier 1 Elite Hockey League (T1EHL), formerly Midwest Elite Hockey League, is located primarily in the Midwest United States and is the premier amateur youth hockey league in the United States. Players from all over the country move to the area where the teams are located to gain exposure and skill development needed for higher levels. Many of the league's top players go on to compete at the Major Junior, NCAA, and NHL level. The T1EHL showcase tournaments and games are heavily scouted by scouts from the USHL, NCAA schools, and the OHL due to the convenience of seeing many top players in one game or weekend.

League format
The T1EHL acts as an umbrella organization for the league's teams which compete at various levels of youth hockey from Squirt Minor to Midget Major 18U. The league also operates three girls levels. The T1EHL is sanctioned by USA Hockey and acts as a development system for the country's top youth players.

League History
The Midwest Elite Hockey league launched a new Midget Major league, the Tier 1 Elite Hockey League for the 2008–2009 season. The T1EHL also re-aligned the league and will consist of 6 divisions of and 32 teams:

Each team will play 46 games with 2 home and 2 away inter division games as well as 6 showcases with each division hosting 3 showcases and travel to each other's showcase once.

As well as providing excellent competition for the teams within the league, the new format will also reduce the travel costs for the organizations. The Midget Major (U18) teams play a rigorous tournament schedule that will now be in part replaced by the showcases that are included in the league schedule. The new Midget league will fly under the T1EHL banner using its rules and policies. USA Hockey will monitor the new league and its development.

For the 2010–2011 season the league added an Eastern Division with the addition of five teams from the northeast US. The Pittsburgh Hornets moved from the Mid-Am division to the new East division and joined new teams: Boston Advantage, Philadelphia Jr. Flyers, Team Comcast, and Buffalo Regals. The Ohio AAA Blue Jackets replaced Pittsburgh in the Mid-Am division, and the Cleveland Barons swapped spots with the Madison Capitols in the Chicago division.

After the 2010–2011 season, six T1EHL teams left to form a new league called the High Performance Hockey League (HPHL). The teams that left included Chicago Young Americans (CYA), Chicago Mission, Team Illinois, Detroit Compuware, Detroit Honeybaked, and Detroit Little Caesars.

Tier 1 expanded the league for the 2015–2016 season. At this point it is still unknown whether this expansion will just occur at the U16 Midget Minor and U18 Midget Major levels, or if all levels will expand with these clubs. The clubs joining Tier 1 next year will be the Omaha AAA Hockey Club, the New Jersey Avalanche, the Anaheim Jr. Ducks, and the Michigan Nationals. It is unclear whether there will be a division realignment for the Midget levels at this point.

Tier 1 Elite Hockey League Teams
Chicago Division:
Chicago Fury
Milwaukee Jr. Admirals
St. Louis AAA Blues
Thunder AAA Hockey
Chicago Mission
Team Illinois
Chicago Reapers
Windy City Storm

Detroit Division:
Belle Tire
Fox Motors
Victory Honda

East Division:
Boston Advantage
New Hampshire Junior Monarchs
North Jersey Avalanche
Philadelphia Jr. Flyers
Washington Little Capitals

Ohio Division
Buffalo Jr. Sabres
Cleveland Barons
Ohio Blue Jackets
Pittsburgh Penguins Elite

Rocky Mountain Division
Colorado Rampage
Colorado Thunderbirds
Dallas Stars Elite
Iowa Wild

West Division:
Anaheim Jr. Ducks
LA Jr. Kings
Phoenix Jr. Coyotes
San Jose Jr. Sharks

Guest Teams:

With the Oakland Jr. Grizzlies leaving the T1EHL for the HPHL beginning the 2017-18 season, these teams fill in the Detroit Division at showcases. They are not considered full members of the league.

 Tri-State Spartans (named the Indy Jr. Fuel for the 2018-19 season)
 Detroit Little Caesars

Tier 1 Elite Hockey League Champions

NHL Draft Picks

References

External links
T1EHL Website

Ice hockey leagues in the United States